The 2010 CONCACAF Women's World Cup Qualifying was the eighth edition of the CONCACAF W Championship, the quadrennial international women's football championship contested by the senior women's national teams of the member associations of CONCACAF, the regional governing body of North America, Central America, and the Caribbean. Serving as the region's 2011 FIFA Women's World Cup Qualifiers, it was played by eight teams from 28 October to 8 November 2010 in Cancún, Mexico. For the second time in its history, it was won by Canada.

The United States, Canada and Mexico received byes into the tournament after taking the top three positions in the 2006 Gold Cup, while five other spots were determined through regional qualification.

Canada and Mexico, by virtue of their semi-final wins, qualified automatically for the 2011 Women's World Cup, while third-place USA advanced to a play-off against Italy for a further finals berth.  Also, Costa Rica and Trinidad and Tobago qualified at the 2011 Pan American Games.

Canada won the tournament with a 1–0 win over Mexico in the Final. Just like during their 1998 CONCACAF Women's Championship win, Canada did not concede a single goal against in the entire tournament. They scored 17 goals, while allowing none, to win their second CONCACAF Women's World Cup Qualifier.  Contrasting Canada's success, the USA's semifinal loss to Mexico marked the first time ever that the USA did not win a World Cup qualifying match.  It was also the second time that the USA failed to appear in a CONCACAF final match, though only because they did not participate in the 1998 Championship.

Qualification

North America
Direct entry:
  (Title Holder)
  (Runner-up)
  (Host)

Central America
Via qualification:
  (Winner Central American Triangular A)
  (Winner Central American Triangular B)

Caribbean
Via qualification:
  (Winner Caribbean qualifying Group F)
  (Winner Caribbean qualifying Group G)
  (Winner Caribbean play-off)

Venues
On 11 October 2010, CONCACAF announced the tournament would be hosted in Mexico, with all matches scheduled to be played in Cancún.

Squads

Group stage

Matches were played at Estadio de Béisbol Beto Ávila and Estadio Quintana Roo in Cancún.

When teams finished level of points, the final order was determined according to:
 greater number of points in matches between tied teams
 superior goal difference in matches between tied teams
 greater number of goals scored in matches between tied teams
 superior goal difference in all group matches
 greater number of goals scored in all group matches
 better fair play record in all group matches (red & yellow cards)
 drawing of lots

Group A

Group B

Knockout stage

Bracket

Semifinals
Winners qualified for 2011 FIFA Women's World Cup.

Third place play-off
Winner advanced to UEFA–CONCACAF play-off.

Final

Goalscorers

References and notes

External links
 CONCACAF Site
Game schedule

 
Women
2011 FIFA Women's World Cup qualification
2010
Qualification tournaments for the 2011 Pan American Games
2010
CON
CON
October 2010 sports events in North America
November 2010 sports events in North America
2010 in Mexican women's sports